The 1968 Kansas State Wildcats football team represented Kansas State University in the 1968 NCAA University Division football season.  The team's head football coach was Vince Gibson.  The Wildcats played their home games in KSU Stadium.

1968 was a significant year in Wildcat football history.  KSU Stadium debuted as the new home for the football team, which moved from Memorial Stadium.  The team was led by sophomore quarterback Lynn Dickey and finished the season as the best passing offense in the Big Eight.

1968 was also significant for the fact that the Wildcats were ranked for only the second time in school history (the first since 1953), and for the first time in the AP Poll.  The team was ranked #20 going in its game against #4 Penn State.  The Wildcats went on to lose the game, 25–9, and would not be ranked the rest of the season, although they would return to the rankings in the 1969 season.

1968 was also the last time the Wildcats beat Nebraska until the 1998 season, and the last time K-State beat Nebraska in Lincoln until 2003.

Schedule

Roster

References

Kansas State
Kansas State Wildcats football seasons
Kansas State Wildcats football